Lisa Seagram (born Ruth Browser; July 7, 1936 – February 1, 2019) was an American actress. She was best known for her roles in  The Carpetbaggers (1964), Caprice (1967) and 2000 Years Later (1969). After appearing in several Italian films, she retired from acting during the 1970s.

Life
Born in Brooklyn, New York, Seagram was the daughter of Harry Brower, a New York City police detective. She worked as a graphic artist after graduating from college. Acting on a friend's suggestion, she began working as a model. After someone suggested that she "looked like an actor", she studied drama for three years, which led to a small role in Shadows (1959). During the 1960s, she played numerous supporting roles, including appearances on television shows such as McHale's Navy, The Beverly Hillbillies, Perry Mason and Batman. She appeared in season 1, episode 11, of Bewitched as Sarah, a fellow witch Endora gets to test the fidelity of Darren. She played the lead female role in the comedy film 2000 Years Later. She relocated for a time to Italy where she appeared in several local productions, most notably playing the lead role in the thriller film Yellow - Le Cugine (1969). The majority of the films she made in Italy were geared to Italian audiences and were never released in the United States. It was while working in Italy that she met her husband, expatriate Canadian actor Marc Fiorini.

After retiring from acting, Seagram first sold commercial real estate. In the 1980s, she created Actors 2000, teaching acting in Hawaii. She later moved the school to Los Angeles.

Seagram died of dementia in Burbank, California on February 1, 2019, at the age of 82.

Filmography

Television
Seagram guest starred on American television sitcom McHale's Navy as the fictional movie star, singer, and dancer Rita Howard entertaining troops in the Pacific theater of WWII. She also guest starred on the sit-coms The Beverly Hillbillies, Bewitched Season 1 episode 11 "It Takes One to Know One" playing Sarah Baker, a rival witch trying to lure Darrin from Samantha as the gorgeous "Jasmine Girl," a seductive model for a perfume advertising campaign, Burke's Law S01E27 "Who Killed Who IV"  and several other TV series in the 1960s such as Batman.

References

External links 
 

1936 births
2019 deaths
People from Brooklyn
American film actresses
American television actresses
Deaths from dementia in California
21st-century American actresses